New Film Makers is a Canadian experimental short film television miniseries which was broadcast on CBC Television in 1969.

Premise
Lyal Brown hosted the series which featured independent short films and interviews with their producers. Chroma key technology was used to show excerpts from films as background for the interviews with filmmakers. Jack Vance developed the series concept, with research by Betty-Jean Beyer.

Scheduling
This half-hour series was broadcast on most Wednesdays at 10:30 p.m. (Eastern) from 23 April to 23 June 1969.

Episodes
 Conversation with Mort Ransen, producer of the National Film Board film Christopher's Movie Matinée, featuring youth in Toronto. The full production was shown on CBC Television several days later
 Student films were the focus of this episode. From the McMaster Film Board, Jim Bennett's "Walk On" was featured. From Montreal, Gabriel Hoss and Serge Denko's "Caught in Rhythm" was shown.
 "Lords of Creation" (Gerald Robinson) and "Flowers" (Takehiko Kamei).
 Toronto film "Satan's Pipers" (Eric Young, Jon Slan).
 More Toronto films: Rat Life and Diet in North America (Joyce Wieland) with Electrocution of the Word (Morley Markson).
 French-language productions were featured.
 Vancouver animated productions were featured such as Thank Heaven (Vancouver Art School) and Henry (Al Sens).

See also
 Canadian Film Makers (1967)
 Canadian Film Makers (1974)
 Sprockets (1975–1976)

References

External links
 

CBC Television original programming
1969 Canadian television series debuts
1969 Canadian television series endings